Hans Leesment (13 February 1873 – 26 August 1944 in Tallinn) was an Estonian general. 
From 1919 up until 1940, he was a founder, and the president, of the Estonian Red Cross. On 24 February 1933 he was promoted to the rank of major general.

References

External links
Terviseleht 

1873 births
1944 deaths
People from Mulgi Parish
People from Kreis Pernau
Estonian Lutherans
Christian People's Party (Estonia) politicians
Members of the Estonian Constituent Assembly
Members of the Riigikogu, 1923–1926
Members of the Riigikogu, 1926–1929
Members of the Riiginõukogu
Estonian major generals
Estonian military doctors
Red Cross personnel
University of Tartu alumni
Russian military personnel of the Russo-Japanese War
Russian military personnel of World War I
Estonian military personnel of the Estonian War of Independence
Recipients of the Order of St. Vladimir, 4th class
Recipients of the Order of St. Anna, 2nd class
Recipients of the Order of St. Anna, 3rd class
Recipients of the Order of Saint Stanislaus (Russian), 2nd class
Recipients of the Order of Saint Stanislaus (Russian), 3rd class
Recipients of the Cross of Liberty (Estonia)
Recipients of the Military Order of the Cross of the Eagle, Class II